Tongqi is a Chinese language neologism for women who have married gay men. Similarly, tongfu is another neologism for men who have married lesbian women.  Liu Dalin, among the first sexologists in Mainland China, estimated that 90% of gay Chinese men marry a heterosexual woman. In the United States, 15-20% of gay men did so as of 2010. Sexologist and sociologist Li Yinhe (李银河) believes there are 20 million male homosexuals in China,  80% of whom marry a woman.
Gay Chinese men are under social pressure to marry and produce a male heir to continue the family line, as Confucian writers such as Mencius place a strong emphasis on this.

Etymology
The word combines  tong from 同性戀 (tongxinglian, homosexuality) or 同志 (tongzhi, a slang for gay) with  qi ("wife").Similarly, tongfu combines  tong with  fu ("husband").

Life as Tongqi
Very few of the women who enter into these marriages are aware that their spouses are gay. Many women have turned to social media because it allows them to maintain anonymity while expressing their feelings about being married to gay men.  The majority of these women worry more about the social stigma of being divorced in Chinese society than they do about being in a loveless marriage. For the men, the shame of being stigmatized as homosexual causes them to enter these marriages in the first place. In addition to the emotional toll of being married to a man who does not desire them physically, nearly 90% of these women suffer physical abuse and "sexual apathy" from their husbands. Many women who are married to gay men in China are dependent on the men for financial survival.  Even with a divorce, they can be left with social and financial hardships. Only 31.2% of tongqi marriages end in divorce, according to a recent survey. Divorce laws in China do not allow women to seek a dissolution of marriage from their husbands if they are gay.

Changes
A lot of these women are speaking out against China's policy against same sex marriage beyond chat rooms.  Recently, tongqi have been seen marching in Hong Kong's gay rights parade to bring visibility to their plight. A new trend among Chinese gay men and lesbian is arrangements called cooperation marriages, where they marry each other publicly while living with a same sex partner in private. There are services which are available to assist in the matching of gay men to lesbians for the purposes of marriage. Research has been conducted about the plight of tongqi by the Harbin Institute of Technology for the first time that encourages the acceptance of gays, to reduce the number of women subjected to these marriages.

See also

Beard (companion)
Same-sex marriage
Lavender marriage
Religion and homosexuality#Confucianism
Fag hag

References

Further reading
 

Chinese culture
Confucian ethics
Filial piety
LGBT marriage
LGBT and religion
Neologisms
Chinese words and phrases
Sham marriage
Wives
Women in China